In the run up to the 2017 Portuguese local elections, various organisations carried out opinion polling to gauge voting intention in several municipalities across Portugal. Results of such polls are displayed in this article. The date range for these opinion polls are from the previous local elections, held on 29 September 2013, to the day the next elections were held, on 1 October 2017.

Polling

Alcobaça

Aveiro

Braga

Batalha

Chaves

Coimbra

Évora

Fafe

Funchal

Gondomar

Guimarães

Leiria

Lisbon

Loures

Maia

Marinha Grande

Matosinhos

Odivelas

Oeiras

Ovar

Paredes

Paços de Ferreira

Pedrógão Grande

Pombal

Ponta do Sol

Porto

Póvoa de Lanhoso

Ribeira Brava

Santa Cruz

São João da Madeira

Sintra

Soure

Valongo

Vila Nova de Gaia

Vila Real de Santo António

References

External links 
 ERC - Official publication of polls
 2017 local election results
 2013 local election results

Opinion polling in Portugal